Vacchiano is an Italian surname. Notable people with the surname include:

Emily Vacchiano, American actress
William Vacchiano (1912–2005), American classical trumpeter

See also
Vacchiano Farm, farm and winery in New Jersey